The smalldorsal cat shark (Apristurus micropterygeus) is a catshark of the family Scyliorhinidae found in the South China Sea, at depths to 915 m. It can grow up to 37 cm. A. micropterygeus is unique among its species in having a narrow and sharply pointed first dorsal fin. However, Nakaya and Sato (2000) recommended that the status of the species be reviewed once additional specimens are available, citing the possibility that the dorsal fin of the holotype may have been malformed. The reproduction of the smalldorsal catshark is oviparous.

References

 

smalldorsal catshark
Marine fish of Southeast Asia
South China Sea
Taxa named by Meng Qing-Wen
Taxa named by Chu Yuan-Ting
Taxa named by Li Sheng (ichthyologist)
smalldorsal cat shark